Shawn Michael McCarthy (born February 22, 1968) is a former American football punter in the National Football League. He was drafted by the Atlanta Falcons in the 12th round of the 1990 NFL Draft and later played for the New England Patriots. McCarthy played college football at Purdue, where he was also a quarterback. He attended Fremont Ross High School and was the football teams' starting quarterback, punter and placekicker.

On November 3, 1991, McCarthy placed a 93-yard punt versus the Buffalo Bills that was downed inside Buffalo's 1-yard line. The punt, which set a Patriots franchise record, was the third longest in NFL history and the longest since the AFL-NFL merger. In Week 13 of the 1991 season, McCarthy threw a complete pass on a fake punt to Ben Coates for an 11-yard gain. It was the only pass attempt of his NFL career.

References

External links
New England Patriots bio

1968 births
Living people
People from Fremont, Ohio
Players of American football from Ohio
American football punters
American football quarterbacks
Purdue Boilermakers football players
New England Patriots players